John McGeer House is a historic home located at 7 Aurora Street in the village of Moravia in Cayuga County, New York.  It is a two-story, brick, Italianate style residence, with a rear wing of frame construction.  The house was built in 1871.  Also on the property is a frame wagon shop, built or expanded to its present form in about 1884.

It was listed on the National Register of Historic Places in 1995.

References

External links

Houses on the National Register of Historic Places in New York (state)
Italianate architecture in New York (state)
Houses completed in 1871
Houses in Cayuga County, New York
National Register of Historic Places in Cayuga County, New York
Moravia (village), New York